Passepartout (or passe-partout) is French for "pass everywhere" and is commonly used in French in the sense of a master key or passkey. It may refer to:

Transportation
 Besson MB.35 Passe Partout (1926), a French two-seat spotter and observation floatplane
 De Marçay Passe-Partout (1920), a small sport and touring aircraft
 French cutter Passe-Partout (1845), also called the Mutin
 Passe-Partout III, a large sailing yacht designed by Tony Castro

Other uses
Jean Passepartout, a character in Jules Verne's Around the World in Eighty Days novel
Passe Partout, a local morning news program on KLFY-TV in Lafayette, Louisiana
Passe-Partout, a French-language children's television program produced from 1977 to 1987
Passe-Partout, a mat used in picture framing
Passepartout, a restaurant run by singer June Tabor in Penrith, Cumbria, England